New Japan Showdown was a two-day professional wrestling event promoted by New Japan Pro-Wrestling (NJPW). The event took place on November 9, 2019 at the San Jose Civic in San Jose, California and on November 11, 2019 at the Globe Theater in Los Angeles, California. The San Jose show was broadcast live on NJPW World, while the Los Angeles show was later available to on-demand viewing.

Results

Night 1: San Jose

Night 2: Los Angeles

See also
2019 in professional wrestling

References

External links
The official New Japan Pro-Wrestling English website

2019 in professional wrestling
2019 in California
November 2019 events in the United States
New Japan Pro-Wrestling shows